Hancock Middle-Senior High School, also known as Hancock High, is a public middle/high school (grades 6 to 12) in Hancock, Washington County, Maryland, United States. Its principal is Jenny Ruppenthal. It enrolls 262 students as of 2016 and School Day is 8:30 to 3:30.

Academic recognition
Hancock Middle-Senior High School was recently named in U.S. News & World Report's annual listing of the Best High Schools in the United States earning a Bronze Award for test scores consistently above state and national averages.

Sports
Hancock Middle-Senior High School has 7 varsity athletic teams, they are:

Fall Sports 
 Football
 Volleyball

Winter Sports 
 Boys Basketball 
 Girls Basketball
 Indoor Track

Spring Sports 
 Baseball
 Outdoor Track
 Softball
In 1933, the boys soccer team won the state championship; however, the school no longer has a boys soccer team.

References

External links

Washington County Public Schools Official Site

Public middle schools in Maryland
Public high schools in Maryland
Public schools in Washington County, Maryland